Flints Peak was named in 1959. It is located in the Vermilion Range in Banff National Park, Alberta.

References

Further reading
 Alan Kane, Scrambles in the Canadian Rockies, P 262

 Glen W. Boles, William Lowell Putnam, Roger W. Laurilla, Canadian Mountain Place Names: The Rockies and Columbia Mountains, P 98

Two-thousanders of Alberta
Mountains of Banff National Park